Bayaraa Naranbaatar (born 11 March 1980) is a male freestyle wrestler from Mongolia.

He was the winner of Men's freestyle wrestling 55 kg at 2005 Summer Universiade.

He participated in the Men's freestyle 55 kg at 2004 Summer Olympics where he was ranked at twelfth place. Naraanbaatar beat Babak Nourzad from Iran, but lost to Korean Kim Hyo-Sub and was eliminated from competition,

He participated in Men's freestyle 55 kg at the 2008 Summer Olympics. In 1/8th final he lost to Russian Besik Kudukhov.

Naranbaatar won silver medal in 2007 FILA Wrestling World Championships and bronze at 2005 FILA Wrestling World Championships.

At the 2012 Summer Olympics, he lost in the second round to Hassan Rahimi.

References

External links
 
 
 
 
 

Living people
1980 births
Olympic wrestlers of Mongolia
Wrestlers at the 2008 Summer Olympics
Wrestlers at the 2004 Summer Olympics
Wrestlers at the 2012 Summer Olympics
Mongolian male sport wrestlers
Wrestlers at the 2002 Asian Games
Wrestlers at the 2006 Asian Games
World Wrestling Championships medalists
Universiade medalists in wrestling
Universiade gold medalists for Mongolia
Asian Games competitors for Mongolia
Medalists at the 2005 Summer Universiade
21st-century Mongolian people
20th-century Mongolian people